Lindula  is a town located in the Nuwara Eliya District, Central Province of Sri Lanka. Together with Talawakele it is administered by the Talawakele-Linduala Urban Council.

References

Populated places in Nuwara Eliya District